Jules Destrée (Marcinelle, 21 August 1863 – Brussels, 3 January 1936) was a Walloon lawyer, cultural critic and socialist politician.  The trials subsequent to the strikes of 1886 determined his commitment within the Belgian Labour Party.  He wrote a Letter to the King in 1912, which is seen as the founding declaration of the Walloon movement.  He is famous for his quote "Il n'y a pas de Belges" (There are no Belgians), pointing to the lack of patriotic feelings in Flemings and Walloons, while pleading for some kind of federal state.

Biography
His father was an engineer in the chemical industry in Marcinelle and Couillet and later became a professor. Jules himself was a gifted student, getting his PhD in Law from the Université Libre de Bruxelles at the age of 20. His younger brother, Olivier Georges, became a monk, first in the Maredsous Abbey, later in the Keizersberg Abbey in Leuven, under the name Bruno Destrée.

Besides his judicial work, he liked circulating among the artistic and literary circles of his time. There, he met etcher Auguste Danse, whose daughter Marie, a niece of Constantin Meunier, he married in 1889.

In 1892, together with Paul Pastur, he founded the Democratic Federation. He started a political career with the socialist party Parti Ouvrier Belge (POB), and was elected as a member of the Belgian Chamber of People's Representatives in 1894, where he continued to work until his death.

He wrote many and diverse publications; prose, political and social works, and studies on artists (like Odilon Redon and Rogier van der Weyden).

In 1911, during an exhibition of ancient arts of the Hainaut, Jules Destrée realised that Wallonia had many specific characteristics. From then on, he expressed his revendications for an autonomous Wallonia. In November, he gave a talk in front of the association of the young lawyers of Brussels (Jeune Barreau de Bruxelles). During this conference, he proteded the political minorisation of the Walloon people, saying, "We are defeated ones and defeated ones governed against our mentality.

Jules Destrée wrote his opened letter in 1912 to the King of the Belgians Albert I. The letter was published in the Revue de Belgique (15 August 1912) and in the Journal de Charleroi (24 August 1912). The largest newspapers, including la Gazette de Charleroi, l'Express and la Meuse, published the letter later on. And, in the foreign countries, for instance The New York Times published a short article about this letter.

After Germany invaded Belgium in 1914, Jules Destrée went into exile in France at the request of the Belgian government, pleading for the Belgian cause in London, Paris and Rome. He also went on diplomatic missions, to Saint Petersburg and to China in 1918.

From 1919 to 1921 he was Minister of Arts and Sciences. He installed a "Fonds des mieux doués", a fund for the education of gifted children from poor families. In 1920 he started the "Académie de Langue et de Littérature françaises de Belgique", the Academy of French Language and Literature of Belgium.

Until his death, he would continue to work on improving the political situation of Wallonia. In 1923 he left, the "Assemblée wallonne" (the Wallonian Assembly), which he co-founded in 1912, because it had not paid enough attention the Walloon working class. In 1929, he signed, together with Camille Huysmans, the "Compromis des Belges" (Compromise of the Belgians). This document judged separatism, accepted the cultural autonomy of Flanders and Wallonia, and suggested a greater autonomy for municipalities and provinces. It foresaw a bilingual Flanders and a unilingual Wallonia (this was before Brabant was split and the Brussels-Capital Region was created as a separate entity).

Because of his engagement in the League of Nations' Committee on Intellectual Cooperation (between 1022 and 1932), Destrée was appointed head of the International Office of Museums (IOM), a unit of the International Institute of Intellectual Cooperation (IIIC), with Euripide Foundoukidis as secretary.
In 1938, the Institut Jules Destrée was founded to promote the regional development of Wallonia. With his heritage, a museum was founded in the attic of the Town Hall of Charleroi (Musée Jules Destrée), which opened in 1988.

Thoughts
According to Destrée, Belgium was composed of two separate entities, Flanders and Wallonia, and a feeling of Belgian nationalism was not possible, illustrated in his 1906 work "Une idée qui meurt: la patrie" (An idea that is dying: the fatherland). In the "Revue de Belgique" of 15 August 1912 he articulates this in his famous and notorious "Lettre au roi sur la séparation de la Wallonie et de la Flandre" (Letter to the king on the separation of Wallonia and Flanders), where he wrote: 

The King agreed secretly with the Destrée's view but not to his proposal of a kind of Home Rule and wrote to his counsellor: I read the letter of Destrée, which, without uncertainty, is some literature of great talent. All that he said is absolutely true, but it is not less true that administrative separation would be an evil with more disadvantages and dangers than any aspect of the current situation.
Contrary to what the title of his letter might suggest, he pleaded not for the separation of Belgium but for some kind of federal state before such a term even existed.

His primary reason was the fear that Flanders, being more densely populated,  would dominate a unitary Belgium. Later, Gaston Eyskens modified his quote, saying "Sire, il n'y a plus de Belges" (Sire, there are no more Belgians), after the first steps were taken to transform Belgian into a federal state.

See also

References

The Jules Destrée Museum, Retrieved October 13, 2006.

External links

Institut Jules-Destrée
R. V. N., art. Jules Destrée (2006)
On the fake antisemitsm of Jules Destree

Belgian Labour Party politicians
Walloon movement activists
Free University of Brussels (1834–1969) alumni
1863 births
1936 deaths
Politicians from Charleroi
Members of the Académie royale de langue et de littérature françaises de Belgique